José Antonio Rojas (born 13 January 1987) is a Chilean footballer. His current club is Deportes Concepción.

Club career
Rojas began playing football for Unión La Calera in 2003. The defender joined Chilean Primera División side Everton de Viña del Mar at age 23.

References

External links
 Profile at BDFA 

1987 births
Living people
Chilean footballers
Primera B de Chile players
Chilean Primera División players
C.D. Antofagasta footballers
Everton de Viña del Mar footballers
Puerto Montt footballers
Unión La Calera footballers
Ñublense footballers
Deportes La Serena footballers
Deportes Santa Cruz footballers
Deportes Concepción (Chile) footballers
Association football defenders
People from Quillota